The 2018 Women's Premier Hockey League was the 3rd edition of the Premier Hockey League, the annual tournament women's field hockey championship of South Africa.

The Blyde River Bunters won the tournament for the first time, defeating the Madikwe Rangers 1–0 in the final.

Competition format

Format
The 2018 Premier Hockey League followed a single round-robin format, followed by a classification round.

During the pool stage teams played each other once. The top four ranked teams qualified for the Classification Round. Team 1 played Team 4, while Team 2 played Team 3 in the two semi-finals. The two victorious teams moved onto the Final, while the losing teams competed for third place.

Point allocation
Match points will be distributed as follows:

 4 points: win by 3+ goals
 3 points: win and shoot-out win
 1 point: shoot-out loss
 0 points: loss

Participating teams
Each squad consists of 20 players, made up of 7 marquee players as determined by SA Hockey’s team, with a further 3 players into their 20 from the “new generation” pool featuring the country’s most exciting young talent. Coaches were forced to release between 4 and 8 players from the 2018 squads ahead of the draft.

Head Coach: Marcelle Keet

Head Coach: Bevan Bennet

Head Coach: Andi Bernstein

Head Coach: 

Head Coach: Inky Zondi

Head Coach: Lenise Marais

Results

Pool stage

Matches

Classification stage

Semi-finals

Third place game

Final

Awards

Final ranking

Goalscorers

References

External links
2018 PHL Women at South African Hockey Association

Premier Hockey League (South Africa)
Premier Hockey League (South Africa)